Cynthia Butare, is a Rwandan–Swiss filmmaker as well as a videographer. She is best known as the director of critically acclaimed Rwandan film Kickin' It With The Kinks.

Personal life
She was born in Geneva, Switzerland. She lived in Geneva until the end of high school and then moved to UK for higher studies.

Career
She obtained a bachelor's degree in Digital Media and Communications and later completed an Master's in Documentary Practice at Manchester Metropolitan University. In 2011, she made the short Kickin' It With The Kinks for her university project. The film receiving a prize for best documentary in her department. Later in 2016, Cynthia along with her friend Mundia, decided to produce a longer version of the film. The film received critical acclaim and screened at several international film festivals. In the same year, she started her own company, 'CB Production'.

While as a teenager, she started blogging in 2003. Even though she stopped blogging after three years, she restarted blogging 2012. In 2013, Butare received the Award for Best Blog of The Year by the BEFFTA. However, then she moved to Rwanda in 2014. While in Rwanda, she made her second documentary film, Ishimwa: From Bloodshed To Grace. It was screened as part of the Rwanda Film Festival. She is currently working on a project called The Return.

Filmography

References

External links
 
 KICKIN' IT WITH THE KINKS, DE CYNTHIA BUTARE: une soirée proposée par Rokhaya Diallo
 

Living people
Rwandan film directors
Swiss film directors
Year of birth missing (living people)
Rwandan film producers
Rwandan women film directors
Swiss women film directors